Peter Timothy Fisher (born 1944) is an Anglican priest.

Fisher was educated at Durham University and Ripon College, Cuddesdon. He was ordained in 1969. After a curacy at St Andrew, Bedford he was Chaplain at the University of Surrey. He was Principal of Lincoln Theological College from 1978 to 1983; and Rector of St Michael, Houghton-le-Spring from 1983 to 1994. Fisher was Principal of Queen's College, Birmingham from 1994 to 2002. After that he was Vicar of St Peter, Maney from 2002 to 2010.

References

1944 births
Living people
Alumni of Ripon College Cuddesdon
Principals of Queen's College, Birmingham
21st-century English Anglican priests
20th-century English Anglican priests
Alumni of St Chad's College, Durham